Chain Letter is the debut studio album by American singer-songwriter Brooke Valentine, released on March 15, 2005, by Subliminal Entertainment and Virgin Records. Work on the album began after Valentine left the female group Best Kept Secret, in order to pursue a solo career. She moved to Los Angeles, California with producer and Subliminal Entertainment CEO Deja the Great to begin work on the album. Valentine enlisted a variety of producers to work on the album including Bink!, Bloodshy & Avant, Déjà "The Great", Jermaine Dupri, Brandon Howard, Lil Jon, Matt Serletic among others.

Musically the album is predominantly a R&B body of work, that features elements of hip hop, pop, rock, and crunk. Upon release "Chain Letter" was met with critical acclaim from music critics who praised the album's production, with other critics comparing the album to the work of film producer Steven Soderbergh. Commercially the album fared well and peaked at sixteen on the Billboard 200 and three on the Billboard Top R&B/Hip-Hop Albums Chart. The album sold 290,000 copies in the US.

The album was preceded by the release of the lead single "Girlfight", that features Big Boi from the band Outkast, and Lil Jon. "Girlfight" was a commercial success peaking at twenty-three on the Billboard Hot 100 as well as making appearances on charts in Ireland, New Zealand, Australia and the UK. The second single released from the album was "Long As You Come Home", which reached number 71 on the Billboard R&B/Hip-Hop Songs chart where it spent 5 weeks. The third single was "Cover Girl", however the song failed to chart.

Background
She started her musical career as a member of the female group Best Kept Secret. To pursue a solo career, she moved to Los Angeles, California with producer and Subliminal Entertainment CEO Deja the Great and signed to Virgin Records.

Singles
The lead single, "Girlfight", which features Lil Jon and Big Boi was first released on January 4, 2005. It succeeded internationally, peaking in the top fifty in Australia and Ireland, and Top 40 in New Zealand and the United Kingdom.

The second single, "Long as You Come Home" was released on July 5, 2005. It peaked at #71 on the US R&B/Hip-Hop chart.

The third single, "Cover Girl" was released on October 18, 2005. It failed to chart. “Laugh Til I Cry” was promoted to radio as well.

Music and lyrics
The album's opening song Girlfight was described as a "friendly crunk" song that contains "grunts" as well as guest appearances from Lil Jon and Big Boi. Lyrically the discusses  female fisticuffs. “Taste of Dis” is a "hyperactive club banger".

“Blah Blah Blah” is an organ-fueled reggae-funk song that lyrically turns Valentine "into a naughty girl" who sings about still loving her "thug boyfriend, strangely demure and believable."
"Cover Girl," is a "somber" song led by an "acoustic guitar and churchy organ swells" and contains a "guitar-based folk song", that lyrically discusses what Valentine has to do "to attract a man".

"I Want You Dead" is, a demented revenge fantasy in which she does "funny and gruesome" things to a wrongdoing ex-lover.

“Thrill of the Chase” is described as containing a "Hendrix riff" in which she uses to underscore her rant against her boyfriend for demanding that she commit to him, introducing the song's concept with lyrics including “I’m really feeling you but you don’t understand / I’m not sure if I can settle down with just one man.”

Critical reception

Upon release "Chain Letter" was met with critical acclaim from music critics.
Allmusic gave a positive review to album, giving it four out of five stars. Allmusic praised the album's production continuing to say "A debut that fulfills and promises at the same time, Chain Letter contains 40 faultless minutes of club tracks and a few minutes of seductive balladry. That's not bad for someone who put it all to bed before hitting the age of 20." Entertainment Weekly gave acclaim to the album comparing it to play like Steven Soderbergh's filmography sayingT"here's a little popcorn for the cineplex and some chewier fare for the art houses. But Valentine's eccentricities, unlike Soderbergh's, actually improve her chances for stardom."

Track listing

Notes
 denotes vocal producer
 denotes additional producer
 denotes co-producer

Sample credits
 "Long As You Come Home" samples "Adventures in the Land of Music" by Dynasty.
 "Million Bucks" samples "I'm Alive" by Spooky Tooth.
 "American Girl" samples "Shake Your Groove Thing" by Peaches & Herb.

Charts

Weekly charts

Year-end charts

See also
2005 in music

References

2005 debut albums
Brooke Valentine albums
Virgin Records albums
Albums produced by Bloodshy & Avant
Albums produced by Matt Serletic
Albums produced by Jermaine Dupri
Albums produced by Bink (record producer)
Albums produced by Lil Jon